Kids in the Way was an American Christian rock band formed in Noblesville, Indiana in 1997. They released three albums on Flicker Records and an unnamed EP in 2010 after which they disbanded. In 2016 they announced they were reuniting under the new name, KIDS.

Biography 
Kids in the Way was formed in 1997 by vocalist David Pelsue, guitarist Nathan Ehman, and the drummer Eric Carter. The band was previously known as Serenity and played a considerably lighter rock sound than when they were Kids in the Way. Kids in the Way released a self-titled EP which set them in place for further record releases and future shows with Audio Adrenaline which was important in their signing to Flicker Records. After releasing their debut album Safe from the Losing Fight, they were able to pick up spots touring with notable bands such as Fireflight, Pillar, and Relient K.

The band reunited in 2009 and started playing shows in and around their home state of Indiana. On January 12, 2010 they announced that they were working on an unnamed EP that they expected to release in March. In the US, it was released for a limited time in the iTunes Store. In 2012 guitarist Nathan Hughes revealed that the new album was a "no-go", and that new music would be coming from a "different band".

Members 
David "Dave" Pelsue – lead vocals
Nathan Hughes – rhythm guitar, backing vocals
Austin Cobb – lead guitar
Jonathan
Jeremie
Eric Carter – drums, backing vocals
Wille Bostic – bass, backing vocals
Rian Flynn – bass guitar, backing vocals (2004–2005)
Nathan Ehman – guitars, backing vocals (2002–2007)

Discography

References 

American Christian rock groups
Musical groups from Indianapolis
American post-hardcore musical groups
Flicker Records artists
Musical groups established in 1997